Charles Brampton (5 February 1828 – 12 June 1895) was an English first-class cricketer active 1854–67 who played for Nottinghamshire. He was born in Nottingham; died aged 67 in Marlborough. He also played non-first-class cricket at county level for Herefordshire, Wiltshire, Monmouthshire, Lincolnshire, Devon, and on one occasion in 1856 for Shropshire while club professional at Stourbridge.

References

1828 births
1895 deaths
English cricketers
Nottinghamshire cricketers
Marylebone Cricket Club cricketers
North v South cricketers
All-England Eleven cricketers
Players cricketers
Non-international England cricketers